Nina Aleksandrovna Bystrova (born 31 March 1944) is a retired Russian rower who won six European titles between 1967 and 1973, as well as a silver medal at the 1974 World Championships.

References

External links
 

1944 births
Living people
Russian female rowers
Soviet female rowers
World Rowing Championships medalists for the Soviet Union
European Rowing Championships medalists